The French Embassy, Tokyo, is the chief diplomatic mission of France in Japan. Since June 2017, its ambassador has been Laurent Pic.

History
The first embassy was established in Iidabashi near the Imperial Palace. It was cramped and was damaged by the aftershocks from an earthquake that shook Tokyo in 1922 and 1923.

The embassy was then moved to the exclusive district of Minami-Azabu. The buildings were destroyed during Allied bombing at the end of World War II. It was not until 1972 that the French State acquired the land.

French community
As of December 31, 2016, there were 9,722 French nationals registered with the embassy. As of December 31, 2014, 7,561 registrants were distributed between two constituencies: Tokyo (6,055) and Kyoto (1,506). The French community in Japan consists mainly of executives or managers of companies, artisans, creators, teachers and researchers.

Recent ambassadors of France to Japan

Access
The embassy is a 7-minute walk from exit 1 of Hiroo Station on the Hibiya Line operated by Tokyo Metro.

See also

Japan–France relations
List of Ambassadors of France to Japan
List of diplomatic missions of France
List of diplomatic missions in Japan
French people in Japan

References

Tokyo
France
Buildings and structures in Minato, Tokyo
France–Japan relations